Burton's line, also known as the Burton line or Burtonian line, is a clinical sign found in patients with chronic lead poisoning. It is a very thin, black-blue line visible along the margin of the gums, at the base of the teeth.

The sign was described in 1840 by Henry Burton:

A similar line, the "bismuth line", occurs in people who have ingested bismuth compounds; bismuth, however, is of very low toxicity.

References 

Medical signs
Lead poisoning